The Minister of Health of Malaysia is Dr. Zaliha Mustafa since 3 December 2022. The minister is supported by Deputy Minister of Health which are vacancy since 24 November 2022. The Minister administers the portfolio through the Ministry of Health.

List of ministers of health
The following individuals have held office as Minister of Health, or any of its precedent titles:

Political Party:

References

Health ministers of Malaysia
Ministry of Health (Malaysia)
Lists of government ministers of Malaysia